Boričevo is a settlement in the City Municipality of Novo Mesto in southeastern Slovenia. It lies in the hills southwest of the town of Novo Mesto. It was traditionally part of Lower Carniola and is now included in the Southeast Slovenia Statistical Region.

Name
Boričevo was attested in written sources as Boriczha in 1368, Gorischew in 1477, and Boritschew in 1498, among other spellings.

References

External links
Boričevo on Geopedia

Populated places in the City Municipality of Novo Mesto